William Morris Hughes  (25 September 1862 – 28 October 1952) was an Australian politician who was the seventh prime minister of Australia, in office from 1915 to 1923. He is best known for leading the country during World War I, but his influence on national politics spanned several decades. Hughes was a member of federal parliament from Federation in 1901 until his death, the only person to have served for more than 50 years. He represented six political parties during his career, leading five, outlasting four, and being expelled from three.

Hughes was born in London to Welsh parents. He emigrated to Australia at the age of 22, and became involved in the fledgling Australian labour movement. He was elected to the New South Wales Legislative Assembly in 1894, as a member of the New South Wales Labor Party, and then transferred to the new federal parliament in 1901. Hughes combined his early political career with part-time legal studies, and was called to the bar in 1903. He first entered cabinet in 1904, in the short-lived Watson Government, and was later the Attorney-General of Australia in each of Andrew Fisher's governments. He was elected deputy leader of the Australian Labor Party in 1914.

Hughes became prime minister in October 1915, when Fisher retired due to ill health. The war was the dominant issue of the time, and his support for sending conscripted troops overseas caused a split within Labor ranks. Hughes and his supporters were expelled from the party in November 1916, but he was able to remain in power at the head of the new National Labor Party, which after a few months merged with the Liberals to form the Nationalist Party of Australia. His government was re-elected with large majorities at the 1917 and 1919 elections. Hughes established the forerunners of the Australian Federal Police and the CSIRO during the war, and also created a number of new state-owned enterprises to aid the post-war economy. He made a significant impression on other world leaders at the 1919 Paris Peace Conference, where he secured Australian control of the former German New Guinea.

At the 1922 Australian federal election, the Nationalists lost their majority in parliament and were forced to form a coalition with the Country Party. Hughes's resignation was the price for Country Party support, and he was succeeded as prime minister by Stanley Bruce. He became one of Bruce's leading critics over time, and in 1928, following a dispute over industrial relations, he and his supporters crossed the floor on a confidence motion and brought down the government. After a period as an independent, Hughes formed his own organisation, the Australian Party, which in 1931 merged into the new United Australia Party (UAP). He returned to cabinet in 1934, and became known for his prescient warnings against Japanese imperialism. As late as 1939, he missed out on a second stint as prime minister by only a handful of votes, losing the 1939 United Australia Party leadership election to Robert Menzies.

Hughes is generally acknowledged as one of the most influential Australian politicians of the 20th century. He was a controversial figure throughout his lifetime, and his legacy continues to be debated by historians. His strong views and abrasive manner meant he frequently made political enemies, often from within his own parties. Hughes's opponents accused him of engaging in authoritarianism and populism, as well as inflaming sectarianism; his use of the War Precautions Act 1914 was particularly controversial. His former colleagues in the Labor Party considered him a traitor, while conservatives were suspicious of what they viewed as his socialist economic policies. He was extremely popular among the general public, particularly ex-servicemen, who affectionately nicknamed him "the little digger".

Early years

Birth and family background

Hughes was born on 25 September 1862, at 7 Moreton Place, Pimlico, London, the son of William Hughes and the former Jane Morris. His parents were both Welsh. His father, who worked as a carpenter and joiner at the Palace of Westminster, was from North Wales and was a fluent Welsh speaker. His mother, a domestic servant, was from the small village of Llansantffraid-ym-Mechain (near the English border), and spoke only English. Hughes was an only child; at the time of their marriage, in June 1861, his parents were both 37 years old.

Wales
Hughes's mother died in May 1869, when he was six years old. His father subsequently sent him to be raised by relatives in Wales. During the school term, he lived with his father's sister, Mary Hughes, who kept a boarding house in Llandudno named "Bryn Rosa". He earned pocket money by doing chores for his aunt's tenants and singing in the choir at the local church. Hughes began his formal schooling in Llandudno, attending two small single-teacher schools. He spent his holidays with his mother's family in Llansantffraid. There, he divided his time between "Winllan", the farm of his widowed aunt (Margaret Mason), and "Plas Bedw", the neighbouring farm of his grandparents (Peter and Jane Morris).

Hughes regarded his early years in Wales as the happiest time of his life. He was immensely proud of his Welsh identity, and he later became active in the Welsh Australian community, frequently speaking at Saint David's Day celebrations. Hughes called Welsh the "language of heaven", but his own grasp of it was patchy. Like many of his contemporaries, he had no formal schooling in Welsh, and had particular difficulties with spelling. Nonetheless, he received and replied to correspondence from Welsh-speakers throughout his political career, and as prime minister famously traded insults in Welsh with David Lloyd George.

London
At the age of eleven, Hughes was enrolled in St Stephen's School, Westminster, one of the many church schools established by the philanthropist Angela Burdett-Coutts, 1st Baroness Burdett-Coutts. He won prizes in geometry and French, receiving the latter from Lord Harrowby. After finishing his elementary schooling, he was apprenticed as a "pupil-teacher" for five years, instructing younger students for five hours a day in exchange for personal lessons from the headmaster and a small stipend. At St Stephen's, Hughes came into contact with the poet Matthew Arnold, who was an examiner and inspector for the local school district. Arnold – who coincidentally had holidayed at Llandudno – took a liking to Hughes, and gifted him a copy of the Complete Works of Shakespeare; Hughes credited Arnold with instilling his lifelong love of literature.

After finishing his initial apprenticeship, Hughes stayed on at St Stephen's as a teaching assistant. He had no interest in teaching as a career though, and also declined Matthew Arnold's offer to secure him a clerkship at Coutts. His relative financial security allowed him to pursue his own interests for the first time, which included bellringing, boating on the Thames, and travel (such as a two-day trip to Paris). He also joined a volunteer battalion of the Royal Fusiliers, which consisted mainly of artisans and white-collar workers. In later life, Hughes recalled London as "a place of romance, mystery and suggestion".

First years in Australia

Queensland
At the age of 22, finding his prospects in London dim, Hughes decided to emigrate to Australia. Taking advantage of an assisted-passage scheme offered by the Colony of Queensland, he arrived in Brisbane on 8 December 1884 after a two-month journey. On arrival, he gave his year of birth as 1864, a deception that was not uncovered until after his death. Hughes attempted to find work with the Education Department, but was either not offered a position or found the terms of employment to be unsuitable. He spent the next two years as an itinerant labourer, working various odd jobs. In his memoirs, Hughes claimed to have worked variously as a fruitpicker, tally clerk, navvy, blacksmith's striker, station hand, drover, and saddler's assistant, and to have travelled (mostly on foot) as far north as Rockhampton, as far west as Adavale, and as far south as Orange, New South Wales. He also claimed to have served briefly in both the Queensland Defence Force and the Queensland Maritime Defence Force. Hughes's accounts are by their nature unverifiable, and his biographers have cast doubt on their veracity – Fitzhardinge states that they were embellished at best and at worst "a world of pure fantasy".

New South Wales

Hughes moved to Sydney in about mid-1886, working his way there as a deckhand and galley cook aboard SS Maranoa. He found occasional work as a line cook, but at one point supposedly had to resort to living in a cave on The Domain for a few days. Hughes eventually found a steady job at a forge, making hinges for colonial ovens. Around the same time, he entered into a common-law marriage with Elizabeth Cutts, his landlady's daughter; they had six children together. In 1890, Hughes moved to Balmain. The following year, with his wife's financial assistance, he was able to open a small shop selling general merchandise. The income from the shop was not enough to live on, so he also worked part-time as a locksmith and umbrella salesman, and his wife as a washerwoman. One of Hughes's acquaintances in Balmain was William Wilks, another future MP, while one of the customers at his shop was Frederick Jordan, a future Chief Justice of New South Wales.

Early political career
In Balmain, Hughes became a Georgist, a street-corner speaker, president of the Balmain Single Tax League, and joined the Australian Socialist League. He was an organiser with the Australian Workers' Union and may have already joined the newly formed Labor Party. In 1894, Hughes spent eight months in central New South Wales organising for the Amalgamated Shearers' Union of Australasia and then won the Electoral district of Sydney-Lang of the New South Wales Legislative Assembly by 105 votes.

While in Parliament he became secretary of the Wharf Labourer's Union. In 1900 he founded and became first national president of the Waterside Workers' Union. During this period Hughes studied law, and was admitted as a barrister in 1903. Unlike most Labor men, he was a strong supporter of Federation and Georgism.

In 1901 Hughes was elected to the first federal Parliament as Labor MP for the Division of West Sydney. He opposed the Barton government's proposals for a small professional army and instead advocated compulsory universal training. In 1903, he was admitted to the bar after several years part-time study. He became a King's Counsel (KC) in 1909. 

In 1911, he married Mary Campbell. He was Minister for External Affairs in Chris Watson's first Labor government. He was Attorney-General in Andrew Fisher's three Labor governments in 1908–09, 1910–13 and 1914–15.

In 1913, at the foundation ceremony of Canberra as the capital of Australia, Hughes gave a speech proclaiming that the country was obtained via the elimination of the indigenous population. "We were destined to have our own way from the beginning..[and]..killed everybody else to get it," Hughes said, adding that "the first historic event in the history of the Commonwealth we are engaged in today [is] without the slightest trace of that race we have banished from the face of the earth." But he warned that "we must not be too proud lest we should, too, in time disappear."

His abrasive manner (his chronic dyspepsia was thought to contribute to his volatile temperament) made his colleagues reluctant to have him as Leader. His on-going feud with King O'Malley, a fellow Labor minister, was a prominent example of his combative style.
Hughes was also the club patron for the Glebe Rugby League team in the debut year of Rugby League in Australia, in 1908. Hughes was one of a number of prominent Labor politicians who were aligned with the Rugby League movement in Sydney in 1908. Rugby League was borne out of a player movement against the Metropolitan Rugby Union who refused to compensate players for downtime from their jobs due to injuries sustained playing Rugby Union. Labor politicians aligned themselves with the new code as it was seen as a strong social standpoint, politically, and it was an enthusiastic professional game, which made the politicians themselves appear in a similar vein, in their opinions anyway.

Prime Minister

Following the 1914 Australian federal election, the Labor Prime Minister of Australia, Andrew Fisher, found the strain of leadership during World War I taxing and faced increasing pressure from the ambitious Hughes who wanted Australia to be firmly recognised on the world stage. By 1915 Fisher's health was suffering and, in October, he resigned and was succeeded by Hughes. In social policy, Hughes introduced an institutional pension for pensioners in benevolent asylums, equal to the difference between the 'act of grace' payment to the institution and the rate of IP.

From March to June 1916, Hughes was in Britain, where he delivered a series of speeches calling for imperial co-operation and economic warfare against Germany. These were published under the title The Day—and After, which was a bestseller. His biographer, Laurie Fitzhardinge, said these speeches were "electrifying" and that Hughes "swept his hearers off their feet". According to two contemporary writers, Hughes's speeches "have in particular evoked intense approbation, and have been followed by such a quickening power of the national spirit as perhaps no other orator since Chatham ever aroused".

In July 1916 Hughes was a member of the British delegation at the Paris Economic Conference, which met to decide what economic measures to take against Germany. This was the first time an Australian representative had attended an international conference.

Hughes was a strong supporter of Australia's participation in World War I and, after the loss of 28,000 men as casualties (killed, wounded and missing) in July and August 1916, Generals Birdwood and White of the First Australian Imperial Force (AIF) persuaded Hughes that conscription was necessary if Australia was to sustain its contribution to the war effort.

However, a two-thirds majority of his party, which included Roman Catholics and trade union representatives as well as the Industrialists (Socialists) such as Frank Anstey, were bitterly opposed to this, especially in the wake of what was regarded by many Irish Australians (most of whom were Roman Catholics) as Britain's excessive response to the Easter Rising of 1916.

In October, Hughes held a national plebiscite for conscription, but it was narrowly defeated. The enabling legislation was the Military Service Referendum Act 1916 and the outcome was advisory only. The narrow defeat (1,087,557 Yes and 1,160,033 No), however, did not deter Hughes, who continued to argue vigorously in favour of conscription. This revealed the deep and bitter split within the Australian community that had existed since before Federation, as well as within the members of his own party. 

Conscription had been in place since the 1910 Defence Act, but only in the defence of the nation. Hughes was seeking via a referendum to change the wording in the act to include "overseas". A referendum was not necessary but Hughes felt that in light of the seriousness of the situation, a vote of "Yes" from the people would give him a mandate to bypass the Senate. The Lloyd George Government of Britain did favour Hughes but only came to power in 1916, several months after the first referendum. The predecessor Asquith government greatly disliked Hughes considering him to be "a guest, rather than the representative of Australia". According to David Lloyd George: "He and Asquith did not get on too well. They would not. They were antipathetic types. As Hughes was never over-anxious to conceal his feelings or restrain his expression of them, and was moreover equipped with a biting tongue, the consultations between them were not agreeable to either".

In reaction to Hughes's campaign for conscription, on 15 September 1916 the NSW executive of the Political Labour League (the state Labor Party organisation at the time) expelled him and other leading New South Wales pro-conscription advocates from the Labor movement. Hughes remained as leader of the federal parliamentary Labor Party until, at 14 November caucus meeting, a no-confidence motion against him was passed. Hughes and 24 others, including almost all of the Parliamentary talent, walked out to form a new party heeding Hughes's cry "Let those who think like me, follow me." This left behind the 43 members of the Industrialists and Unionists factions. That same evening Hughes tendered his resignation to the Governor-General, received a commission to form a new Government, and had his recommendations accepted. Years later, Hughes said, "I did not leave the Labor Party, The party left me." The timing of Hughes's expulsion from the Labor Party meant that he became the first Labor leader who never led the party to an election. On 15 November, Frank Tudor was elected unopposed as the new leader of the Federal Parliamentary Australian Labor Party.

Nationalist Party 

Hughes and his followers, which included many of Labor's early leaders, called themselves the National Labor Party and began laying the groundwork for forming a party that they felt would be both avowedly nationalist as well as socially radical. Hughes was forced to conclude a confidence and supply agreement with the opposition Commonwealth Liberal Party to stay in office.

A few months later, the Governor-General, Ronald Munro Ferguson, 1st Viscount Novar, persuaded Hughes and Liberal Party leader Joseph Cook (himself a former Labor man) to turn their wartime coalition into a formal party. This was the Nationalist Party of Australia, which was formally launched in February.  Although the Liberals were the larger partner in the merger, Hughes emerged as the new party's leader, with Cook as his deputy.  The presence of several working-class figures—including Hughes—in what was basically an upper- and middle-class party allowed the Nationalists to convey an image of national unity.  At the same time, he became and remains a traitor in Labor histories.

At the 1917 Australian federal election Hughes and the Nationalists won a huge electoral victory, which was magnified by the large number of Labor MPs who followed him out of the party. At this election Hughes gave up his working-class Sydney seat and was elected for the Division of Bendigo, after he won the seat by defeating the sitting Labor MP Alfred Hampson, and both marks the only time that a sitting prime minister had challenged and ousted another sitting MP for his seat along with him becoming the first of only a handful of Members of the Australian Parliament who have represented more than one state or territory.

Hughes had promised to resign if his Government did not win the power to conscript. Queensland Premier T. J. Ryan was a key opponent to conscription, and violence almost broke out when Hughes ordered a raid on the Government Printing Office in Brisbane, with the aim of confiscating copies of Hansard that covered debates in the Queensland Parliament where anti-conscription sentiments had been aired. A second plebiscite on conscription was held in December 1917, but was again defeated, this time by a wider margin. Hughes, after receiving a vote of no confidence in his leadership by his party, resigned as Prime Minister.  However, there were no credible alternative candidates.  For this reason, Munro-Ferguson used his reserve power to immediately re-commission Hughes, thus allowing him to remain as Prime Minister while keeping his promise to resign.

Domestic policy

Electoral reform

The government replaced the first-past-the-post electoral system applying to both houses of the Federal Parliament under the Commonwealth Electoral Act 1903 with a preferential system for the House of Representatives in 1918. That preferential system has essentially applied ever since. A multiple majority-preferential system was introduced at the 1919 Australian federal election for the Senate, and that remained in force until it was changed to a quota-preferential system of proportional representation in 1948. Those changes were considered to be a response to the emergence of the Country Party, so that the non-Labor vote would not be split, as it would have been under the previous first-past-the-post system.

Science and industry

Research body
In early 1916, Hughes established the Advisory Council on Science and Industry, the first national body for scientific research and the first iteration of what is now the CSIRO. The council had no basis in legislation, and was intended only as a temporary body to be replaced with "Bureau of Science and Industry" as soon as possible. However, due to wartime stresses and other considerations the council endured until 1920, at which point an act of parliament was passed transforming it into a new government agency, the Institute of Science and Industry. According to Fitzhardinge: "The whole affair was highly typical of Hughes's methods. An idea coming from outside happened to chime with his preoccupation of the moment. He seized it, put his own stamp on it, and pushed it through to the point of realization. Then, having established the machinery, he expected it to run itself while he turned his full energies elsewhere, and tended to be evasive or testy if he was called back to it. Yet his interest was genuine, and without his enthusiasm and drive the Commonwealth intervention would either not have come at all or would have been far slower".

Aviation

It was a scheme of Hughes' devising that set the scene for long-distance civil aviation in Australia. His interest in the possibilities of peacetime aviation was sparked by his flights travelling between London and Paris for the Paris Peace Conference. On a Christmas visit the year before, in 1918, to wounded servicemen convalescing in Kent, Hughes had met Australian pilots who were facing the seven-week sea voyage home and were eager to pioneer an air route and fly to Australia instead. Such a vast distance had never been attempted by air; the first ocean crossing by aircraft occurred only months later in June 1919. Despite the risks of such a venture, Hughes' eagerness to see Australia at the forefront of technological development and in a central position in world affairs, had him seeking the support of his cabinet for a scheme to establish a Britain–Australia route. A February 1919 cable from Hughes said: "Several Australian aviators are desirous of attempting flight London to Australia they are all first-class men and very keen your thoughts", and also advised the cabinet of the advantages that such a groundbreaking flight would offer Australia: "would be a great advertisement for Australia and would concentrate the eyes of the world on us."

A month later, the acting Prime Minister of Australia, William Watt, announced: "With a view to stimulating aerial activity, the Commonwealth Government has decided to offer £10,000 for the first successful flight to Australia from Great Britain." The reward would go to the first crew to complete the journey in under thirty days. Brothers Ross and Keith Smith, pilot and navigator, and mechanics Walter Shiers and Jim Bennett won the prize when their Vickers Vimy G-EAOU twin engine plane landed in Darwin on 10 December 1919. The flight set a record for distance travelled by aircraft, having flown , surpassing the previous record of  set the year before on a Cairo to Delhi flight. Hughes achieved his aim of garnering world press attention for Australia, while Australia's first, and one of the world's earliest airlines, Qantas, was founded in 1920, commencing international passenger flights in 1935. A cofounder of the airline, Hudson Fysh, who had been commissioned by the government to survey landing fields in northern Australia for the competition, was present to greet the crew of the Vimy when it landed.

Paris Peace Conference 

In 1919 Hughes, with former Prime Minister Joseph Cook, travelled to Paris to attend the Versailles Peace Conference. He remained away for 16 months, and signed the Treaty of Versailles on behalf of Australia – the first time Australia had signed an international treaty.

At a meeting of the Imperial War Cabinet on 30 December 1918, Hughes warned that if they "were not very careful, we should find ourselves dragged quite unnecessarily behind the wheels of President Wilson's chariot". He added that it was intolerable for Wilson "to dictate to us how the world was to be governed. If the saving of civilisation had depended on the United States, it would have been in tears and chains to-day". He also said that Wilson had no practical scheme for a League of Nations and added: "The League of Nations was to him what a toy was to a child—he would not be happy till he got it". At the Paris Peace Conference, Hughes clashed with Wilson. When Wilson reminded him that he spoke for only a few million people, Hughes replied: "I speak for 60,000 dead. How many do you speak for?"

The British Dominions of New Zealand, South Africa and Australia argued their case to keep their occupied German possessions of German Samoa, German South West Africa, and German New Guinea respectively; these territories were given as "Class C Mandates" to the respective Dominions. In a same-same deal Japan obtained control over its occupied German possessions north of the equator. At the meeting of 30 January, Hughes clashed with Wilson on the question of mandates, as Hughes preferred formal sovereignty over the islands. According to the British Prime Minister, David Lloyd George, Wilson was dictatorial and arrogant in his approach to Hughes, adding that "Hughes was the last man I would have chosen to handle in that way". Lloyd George described how, after Hughes stated his case against subjecting the islands conquered by Australia to a mandate:

President Wilson pulled him up sharply and proceeded to address him personally in what I would describe as a heated allocution rather than an appeal. He dwelt on the seriousness of defying world opinion on this subject. Mr. Hughes, who listened intently, with his hand cupped around his ear so as not to miss a word, indicated at the end that he was still of the same opinion. Whereupon the President asked him slowly and solemnly: "Mr. Hughes, am I to understand that if the whole civilised world asks Australia to agree to a mandate in respect of these islands, Australia is prepared still to defy the appeal of the whole civilised world?” Mr. Hughes answered: "That's about the size of it, President Wilson". Mr. Massey grunted his assent of this abrupt defiance.

However, South Africa's Louis Botha intervened on Wilson's side, and the mandates scheme went through. Hughes's frequent clashes with Wilson led to Wilson labelling him a "pestiferous varmint".

Hughes, unlike Wilson or South African Prime Minister Jan Smuts, demanded heavy reparations from  the German Empire, suggesting the sum of £24,000,000,000 of which Australia would claim many millions to off-set its own war debt. Hughes was a member of the British delegation on the Reparations Committee, with Walter Cunliffe, 1st Baron Cunliffe and John Hamilton, 1st Viscount Sumner. When the Imperial Cabinet met to discuss the Hughes Report, Winston Churchill asked Hughes if he had considered the effects that reparations would have on working-class German households. Hughes replied that "the Committee had been more concerned in considering the effects upon the working-class households in Great Britain, or in Australia, if the Germans did not pay an indemnity".

At the Treaty negotiations, Hughes was the most prominent opponent of the inclusion of Japan's Racial Equality Proposal, which as a result of lobbying by him and others was not included in the final Treaty. His position on this issue reflected the dominant racist attitudes of the White Australia policy. He told David Lloyd George that he would leave the conference if the clause was adopted. Hughes offered to accept the clause so long as it did not effect immigration policy but the Japanese turned the offer down. Lloyd George said that the clause "was aimed at the restrictions and disabilities which were imposed by certain states against Japanese emigration and Japanese settlers already within their borders".

Hughes had entered politics as a trade unionist, and like most of the Australian working class was very strongly opposed to Asian immigration to Australia (excluding Asian immigration was a popular cause with unions in Canada, the U.S, Australia, and New Zealand in the early 20th century). Hughes believed that accepting the Racial Equality clause would mean the end of the White Australia immigration policy that had been adopted in 1901, one of his subordinates writing: "No Gov't could live for a day in Australia if it tampered with a White Australia ...The position is this – either the Japanese proposal means something or it means nothing: if the former, out with it; if the latter, why have it?"{ He later said that "the right of the state to determine the conditions under which persons shall enter its territories cannot be impaired without reducing it to a vassal state", adding: "When I offered to accept it provided that words were incorporated making it clear that it was not to be used for the purpose of immigration or of impairing our rights of self-government in any way, [the Japanese delegate] Baron Makino was unable to agree".

When the proposal failed, Hughes reported in the Australian parliament:The White Australia is yours. You may do with it what you please, but at any rate, the soldiers have achieved the victory and my colleagues and I have brought that great principle back to you from the conference, as safe as it was on the day when it was first adopted.

Japan was notably offended by Hughes's position on the issue. Like Jan Smuts of South Africa, Hughes was concerned by the rise of Japan. Within months of the declaration of the European War in 1914, Japan, Australia and New Zealand had seized all German territorial possessions in the Pacific. Though Japan had occupied German possessions with the blessing of the British, Hughes felt alarm at this turn of events.

With reference to Hughes's actions at the Peace Conference, the historian Ernest Scott said that although Hughes failed to secure sovereignty over the conquered German islands or relief for Australia's war debts, "both he and his countrymen found satisfaction with his achievements. By characteristic methods he had gained single-handed at least the points that were vital to his nation's existence". Joan Beaumont said Hughes became "something of a folk hero in later Australian historiography for his assertiveness at the Paris peace conference".

Seth Tillman described him as "a noisesome demagogue", the "bete noir  of Anglo-American relations". Unlike Smuts, Hughes totally opposed the concept of the League of Nations, as in it he saw the flawed idealism of "collective security". He declared in June 1919 that Australia would rely on the League "but we shall keep our powder dry".

1920–1923

Hughes demanded that Australia have independent representation within the newly-formed League of Nations. Despite the rejection of his conscription policy, Hughes retained popularity with Australian voters and, at the 1919 Australian federal election, his government was comfortably re-elected.

After 1920, Hughes's political position declined. Many of the more conservative elements of his own party never trusted him because they thought he was still a socialist at heart, citing his interest in retaining government ownership of the Commonwealth Shipping Line and the Australian Wireless Company. However, they continued to support him for some time after the war, if only to keep Labor out of power.

A new party, the Country Party (known since 1975 as the National Party of Australia), was formed, representing farmers who were discontented with the Nationalists' rural policies, in particular Hughes's acceptance of a much higher level of tariff protection for Australian industries, that had expanded during the war, and his support for price controls on rural produce. In the New Year's Day Honours of 1922, Hughes's wife Mary was appointed a Dame Grand Cross of the Order of the British Empire (GBE).

At the 1921 Imperial Conference, Hughes argued unsuccessfully in favour of renewing the Anglo-Japanese Alliance.

At the 1922 Australian federal election, Hughes gave up the seat of Bendigo and transferred to the upper-middle-class Division of North Sydney, thus giving up one of the last symbolic links to his working-class roots.  The Nationalists lost their outright majority at the election. The Country Party, despite its opposition to Hughes's farm policy, was the Nationalists' only realistic coalition partner.  However, party leader Earle Page let it be known that he and his party would not serve under Hughes. Under pressure from his party's right wing, Hughes resigned in February 1923 and was succeeded by his Treasurer, Stanley Bruce. His eight-year tenure was the longest for a  Prime Minister until Robert Menzies passed him in 1957.

Whilst the incumbent prime minister, Hughes switched seats at both the 1917 and 1922 elections, the only prime minister to have done so not once but twice. All other elections have seen the prime minister re-contest the seat that they held prior to the election.

Political eclipse and re-emergence
Hughes played little part in parliament for the remainder of 1923. He rented a house in Kirribilli, New South Wales in his new electorate and was recruited by The Daily Telegraph to write a series of articles on topics of his choosing. In the articles he defended his legacy as prime minister and stated he would support the new government as long as it followed his principles. In 1924, Hughes embarked on a lecture tour of the United States. His health broke down midway through the tour, while he was in New York. As a result he cancelled the rest of his engagements and drove back across the country in a new Flint automobile, which he brought back to Australia. Later in the year he purchased a house in Lindfield, which was to be his primary residence for the rest of his life. In 1925 Hughes again had little involvement in parliamentary affairs, but began to portray himself as "champion of Australian industries struggling to get established against foreign competition and government indifference", with the aid of his friends James Hume Cook and Ambrose Pratt.

Hughes was furious at being ousted by his own party and nursed his grievance on the back-benches until 1929, when he led a group of back-bench rebels who crossed the floor of the Parliament to bring down the Bruce government. Hughes was expelled from the Nationalist Party, and formed his own party, the Australian Party. After the Nationalists were heavily defeated in the ensuing election, Hughes initially supported the Labor government of James Scullin. He had a falling-out with Scullin over financial matters, however. In 1931 he buried the hatchet with his former non-Labor colleagues and joined the Nationalists and several right-wing Labor dissidents under Joseph Lyons in forming the United Australia Party (UAP), under Lyons' leadership. He voted with the rest of the UAP to bring the Scullin government down.

1930s

The UAP won a sweeping victory at the 1931 election. Lyons sent Hughes to represent Australia at the 1932 League of Nations Assembly in Geneva and in 1934 Hughes became Minister for Health and Repatriation in the Lyons government. Later Lyons appointed him Minister for External Affairs, but Hughes was forced to resign in 1935 after his book Australia and the War Today exposed a lack of preparation in Australia for what Hughes correctly supposed to be a coming war. Soon after, the Lyons government tripled the defence budget. Hughes also wrote in Australia and the War Today that the League of Nations was broken and that it could have worked only if it had been backed by force. He believed that every nation must look to its own defences and that, as Britain was preoccupied in European affairs, Australia would have to defend itself.

After the 1931 Japanese invasion of Manchuria, Hughes believed that the British should remain neutral, and adopted the same attitude towards Italy's invasion of Abyssinia in 1935. Hughes believed that the British Empire was in danger because of its weakness in the Mediterranean.

Hughes was brought back to Australia by Lyons as Minister for External Affairs in 1937. In 1938 Germany requested the return of her Pacific colonies but Hughes declared that Australia should hold onto New Guinea, and in April 1939 he said that if Germany wanted colonies she would have to fight for them.

By the time of Lyons' death in 1939, Hughes was also serving as Attorney-General and Minister for Industry. He also was Minister for the Navy, Minister for Industry and Attorney-General at various times under Lyons' successor, Robert Menzies.

World War II
Defence issues became increasingly dominant in public affairs with the rise of Fascism in Europe and militant Japan in Asia. From 1938, Prime Minister Joseph Lyons had Hughes head a recruitment drive for the Defence Forces. On 7 April 1939, Lyons died in office. The United Australia Party selected Robert Menzies as his successor to lead a minority government on the eve of World War Two. Australia entered the Second World War on 3 September 1939 and a special War Cabinet was created after war was declared – initially composed of Prime Minister Menzies and five senior ministers including Hughes. Labor opposition leader John Curtin declined to join and Menzies lost his majority at the 1940 Election. With the Allies suffering a series of defeats and the threat of war growing in the Pacific, the Menzies Government (1939-1941) relied on two independents, Arthur Coles and Alex Wilson for its parliamentary majority.

Unable to convince Curtin to join in a War Cabinet and facing growing pressure within his own party, Menzies resigned as Prime Minister on 29 August 1941. Although the UAP had been in government for a decade, it was so bereft of leadership that a joint UAP-Country meeting elected Country Party leader Arthur Fadden to lead the Coalition. Hughes remained in the Fadden government, serving as Attorney-General and Minister for the Navy. A month later, Coles and Wilson joined with the Labor opposition to defeat the budget and bring down the government. The independents, under prodding from Governor-General Alexander Hore-Ruthven, 1st Earl of Gowrie, then threw their support to Opposition Leader John Curtin, who was sworn in as Prime Minister on 7 October 1941. Going into opposition the UAP opted for a joint Coalition opposition led by Fadden, which led Menzies to resign the leadership. The 79-year-old Hughes was narrowly elected leader on 9 October but widely regarded as a stop-gap given his age.

On 7 December, Japan attacked Pearl Harbor. Soon afterwards, Hughes criticised the British government for their weakness in the Far East and declared that they were living on "fast-fading gleams of British triumphs in other wars". However, in February 1942 he said that "Britain has temporarily lost control of the seas but she has lost it in an effort to protect Australia. It would be well if those who criticise Britain would turn the searchlights on Australia". In August he criticised the defensive strategy of the Allies in the Pacific but after the Battle of the Solomons he praised the United States' armed forces. Hughes opposed the Curtin government's Statute of Westminster Adoption Act 1942, which incorporated sections 2–6 of the Statute of Westminster 1931 into law. He believed that Britain and the Dominions should instead work together for a common foreign policy.

Hughes led the UAP into the 1943 Australian federal election largely by refusing to hold any party meetings and by agreeing to let Fadden lead the Opposition as a whole. The Coalition was severely defeated, winning only 19 seats. Hughes himself was nearly defeated in North Sydney on a swing of over 14 percent, seeing his majority dwindle from a comfortably safe 67 percent to a marginal 53 percent.  After the election, Hughes yielded the leadership of the UAP back to Menzies.

Final years

In February 1944, the parliamentary UAP voted to withdraw its members from the Advisory War Council. Hughes and Menzies resigned, but Percy Spender chose to remain on the council and was expelled from the UAP. A few months later, Hughes rejoined the War Council at the personal invitation of John Curtin. He was expelled from the UAP on 14 April 1944, and replaced as deputy leader by Eric Harrison. Hughes and Spender sat as an independents until 13 September 1945, when they joined the new Liberal Party of Australia that had been founded earlier in the year. By that point the War Council had been abolished.

A major redistribution and expansion of the House of Representatives occurred prior to the 1949 election, with much of the northern portion of North Sydney transferred to the new Division of Bradfield. Hughes faced a preselection challenge for the first time since 1894, but defeated Harry Turner for Liberal Party endorsement and won a comfortable victory. He was re-elected to the House of Representatives for the 20th and final time at the 1951 Australian federal election, with 79 percent of the vote. Hughes's last speech in parliament was an attack on the Menzies Government's decision to sell its share in Commonwealth Oil Refineries, one of the state-owned enterprises his government had established over 30 years earlier. According to H.V. Evatt, his speech "seemed at once to grip the attention of all honourable members present ... nobody left the House, and nobody seemed to dare to move".

Hughes celebrated a number of milestones in his last years in parliament. In 1944, a celebratory dinner was held to commemorate the 50th anniversary of his election to the Parliament of New South Wales, and 50 consecutive years of service as an MP. Prime Minister John Curtin toasted him as someone who had "fought like hell for what he believed to be right, and for that Australia will honour him". In June 1951, Hughes was the guest of honour at a banquet marking the golden jubilee of the federal parliament. The following year, "almost every member of the House of Representatives and Senate" attended his birthday dinner. Prime Minister Robert Menzies observed that Hughes had been a member of every political party at one time or another, at which point Arthur Fadden interjected that he had never joined the Country Party. Hughes then remarked "had to draw the line somewhere, didn't I?".

Death and funeral

Hughes died on 28 October 1952, aged 90, at his home in Lindfield. His state funeral was held at St Andrew's Cathedral, Sydney, and was one of the largest Australia has seen: some 450,000 spectators lined the streets. He was later buried at Macquarie Park Cemetery and Crematorium with his daughter Helen; his widow Dame Mary joined them upon her death in 1958.

At the age of 90 years, one month and three days, Hughes is the oldest person ever to have been a member of the Australian parliament. His death sparked the 1952 Bradfield by-election. He had been a member of the House of Representatives for 51 years and seven months, beginning his service in the reign of Queen Victoria and ending it in the reign of Queen Elizabeth II. Including his service in the New South Wales colonial parliament before that, Hughes had spent a total of 58 years as an MP, and had never lost an election. His period of service remains a record in Australia. He was the last member of the original Australian Parliament elected in 1901 still serving in Parliament when he died. Hughes was the penultimate member of the First Parliament to die; King O'Malley outlived him by fourteen months. Hughes was also the last surviving member of the Watson Cabinet, as well as the first and third Cabinets of Andrew Fisher.

Personal life

First marriage

Soon after arriving in Sydney, Hughes entered into a common-law marriage with Elizabeth Cutts, the daughter of one of his landladies. Their relationship was never formally registered or solemnised, but they lived as husband and wife and had six children together – William (b. 1891; died in infancy), Ethel (b. 1892), Lily (b. 1893), Dolly (b. 1895), Ernest (b. 1897), and Charles (b. 1898). They also raised Arthur (b. 1885), Elizabeth's son from a previous relationship, who took Hughes as his surname. Their marriage was solid, though sometimes strained by Hughes's devotion to his work and frequent absences from home. Elizabeth had little interest in politics, and was sometimes ill at ease in the social situations that occurred as her husband's career progressed. She died of heart failure on 1 September 1906, aged 42, after a long period of ill health.

Second marriage
After his first wife's death, Hughes's oldest daughter Ethel kept house for him and helped look after the younger children. After a brief courtship, he remarried on 26 June 1911 to Mary Ethel Campbell, the daughter of a well-to-do pastoralist. At the time of their marriage, he was 48 and she was 37. Mary was politically and socially astute, and her husband often turned to her for advice on political matters. Unusually for the time, he insisted that he be accompanied by her on all of his overseas trips, even those made during wartime. Through his second marriage, Hughes also became the brother-in-law of John Haynes, one of the founders of The Bulletin. His niece, Edith Haynes, lived with him and his wife as a companion for many years.

The only child from Hughes's second marriage was Helen Myfanwy Hughes, who was born in 1915 (a few months before he became prime minister). He doted upon her, calling her the "joy and light of my life", and was devastated by her death in childbirth in 1937, aged 21. Her son survived and was adopted by a friend of the family, with his grandfather contributing towards his upkeep. Because she was unmarried at the time, the circumstances of Helen's death were kept hidden and did not become generally known until 2004, when the ABC screened a programme presented by the actor Martin Vaughan. Vaughan had played Billy Hughes in the 1975 film Billy and Percy, and his continuing interest in him led to the unearthing of Helen's fate.

Health

Hughes had a severe hearing loss that began when he was relatively young and worsened with age. He relied on a primitive electronic hearing aid, which was so bulky that it could only be worn for short periods and had to be carried around in a box. However, his deafness could sometimes be to his advantage, as he could feign misapprehension or simply turn off his device when he no longer wished to listen to someone. He had a "naturally weak constitution", suffering frequently from colds and other infections, and to compensate became a "fanatical devotee of physical fitness". He also suffered from chronic indigestion, on account of which he abstained from red meat and alcohol and rarely ate large meals. Hughes often worked himself to exhaustion, and required long periods of convalescence to recharge – sometimes weeks or even months. He was prone to bouts of depression interspersed with periods of euphoria, and following a near nervous breakdown in 1924 was diagnosed with "psychasthenia".

Religion
Hughes was a lifelong Anglican. He inherited this affiliation from his maternal side – his father was a Primitive Baptist and a deacon at the Welsh Baptist Church in London, though he wed with Anglican rites. Hughes attended church schools as a boy, and knew the King James Bible "back to front". As an adult, he would often use Biblical turns of phrase in his writing and public speaking. Hughes's participation in organised religion seemingly declined after he moved to Australia, and some writers have suggested that he became an agnostic or an atheist. The evidence for this is largely circumstantial – he was not a regular churchgoer, his first marriage was never solemnised in a church, and he frequently used blasphemous language.

All of Hughes's biographers have regarded him as a sincere Christian, albeit with a rather idiosyncratic theology. Fitzhardinge writes that Hughes had "a generalised faith in the spiritual values of Christianity" combined with "a profound belief in the after-life and the all-pervasiveness of God". Hughes rarely addressed metaphysics in his own works, but in his memoirs did note that he had rejected the doctrine of predestination at an early age: "I believed as a man sowed so he should reap ... by faith and works he might find salvation." Manning Clark was somewhat skeptical of the earnestness of the beliefs that Hughes professed in public. With regard to Hughes's personal philosophy, Clark wrote that he had a "bleakly Hobbesian view of life", seeing it as "a savage elemental struggle for survival in which strong men crushed the weak".

Hughes frequently exploited religion for political ends. In his early days in the labour movement, he drew on his mastery of scripture to reassure Christians that socialism was not anti-religious or atheistic. Hughes became stridently anti-Catholic during World War I, though this was due to political interference from the church hierarchy rather than on theological grounds. He "inflamed sectarianism to a tragic degree" with vitriolic personal attacks on Catholic leaders; James Scullin, Australia's first Catholic prime minister, would later suggest that Hughes's divisiveness "very nearly wrecked Australia". He also banned the use of German in Australian churches, though this affected Lutherans more than Catholics.

Legacy
Hughes, a tiny, wiry man, with a raspy voice and an increasingly wizened face, was an unlikely national leader, but during the First World War he acquired a reputation as a war leader—the troops called him the "Little Digger"—that sustained him for the rest of his life. He is remembered for his outstanding political and diplomatic skills, for his many witty sayings, and for his irrepressible optimism and patriotism. At the same time, the Australian labour movement never forgave him for defecting to the conservatives, and still considers him a "rat".

Honours
 King's Counsel (KC), 1909 
 Queen's Privy Council for Canada (PC), 1916 
 Order of the Companions of Honour (CH), 1941
 Grand Officer of the Legion of Honour, 1941
 In 1916 he declined the offer of a peerage from the UK Prime Minister David Lloyd George, saying Good God, David! Do you want to ruin me? I am Labor Prime Minister of Australia and President of the Waterside Workers' Federation. He also declined offers of knighthood.

Freedom of the City
Hughes was honored with fifteen "Freedom of the City" awards – more than any other Prime Minister of Australia. Among these are the following cities in the United Kingdom:
 Aberdeen, Birmingham, Bristol, Cardiff, Edinburgh, Glasgow, Liverpool, London, Manchester, Sheffield, York

Honorary appointments
Hughes received honorary degrees from the following universities: 
 University of Edinburgh
 University of Glasgow
 University of Birmingham 
 University of Oxford
 University of Wales 
 
The Division of Hughes and the suburb of Hughes, Australian Capital Territory in Canberra are named after him. A park in Lane Cove, New South Wales, is named 'Hughes Park' after Billy and Dame Mary Hughes.

In 1972, he was honoured on a postage stamp bearing his portrait issued by Australia Post.

After marrying his wife Mary in 1911, the couple went on a long drive, because he did not have time for a honeymoon. Their car crashed where the Sydney–Melbourne road crosses the Sydney–Melbourne railway north of Albury, New South Wales, leading to the level crossing there being named after him; it was later replaced by the Billy Hughes Bridge.

Published works
Crusts and Crusades: tales of bygone days (Sydney: Angus and Robertson, 1947).
Policies and Potentates (Sydney: Angus and Robertson, 1950).

See also
First Hughes Ministry
Second Hughes Ministry
Third Hughes Ministry
Fourth Hughes Ministry
Fifth Hughes Ministry
Racial Equality Proposal
Billy Hughes egg-throwing incident

Notes

References

Sources and further reading

External links

 Billy Hughes at the National Film and Sound Archive
 

|-

|-

Prime Ministers of Australia
Members of the Cabinet of Australia
Australian King's Counsel
Australian ministers for Foreign Affairs
Australian Ministers for Health
Australian sailors
Attorneys-General of Australia
Australian Labor Party members of the Parliament of Australia
Liberal Party of Australia members of the Parliament of Australia
Australian Members of the Order of the Companions of Honour
Members of the Australian House of Representatives
Members of the Australian House of Representatives for Bendigo
Members of the Australian House of Representatives for Bradfield
Members of the Australian House of Representatives for North Sydney
Members of the Australian House of Representatives for West Sydney
Australian members of the Privy Council of the United Kingdom
Members of the King's Privy Council for Canada
Members of the New South Wales Legislative Assembly
Nationalist Party of Australia members of the Parliament of Australia
United Australia Party members of the Parliament of Australia
Welsh emigrants to Australia
1862 births
1952 deaths
National Labor Party members of the Parliament of Australia
Independent members of the Parliament of Australia
Australian Party members of the Parliament of Australia
Articles containing video clips
English emigrants to Australia
Australian nationalists
Australian Anglicans
Critics of the Catholic Church
Leaders of the Australian Labor Party
Leaders of the United Australia Party
Leaders of the Nationalist Party of Australia
20th-century Australian politicians
Georgist politicians
Royal Fusiliers soldiers